"Elevator" is a song by American rapper Eminem, featured on his 2009 album Relapse: Refill, the re-release of his album Relapse. "Elevator" was the second promotional single released on December 15, released the same day as "Hell Breaks Loose". On the issue of January 2, 2010, "Elevator" debuted at #67 on the Billboard Hot 100.

Controversy 
The lyrics of the song struck controversy, as Eminem raps this message to former *NSYNCer Lance Bass: "Sorry Lance, Mr. Lambert and Aiken ain't gonna make it... They get so mad when I call them both faggots...." Adam Lambert, the American Idol season 8 runner-up said on Twitter: "Wow Eminem mentioned me in a song? I must be doin something right," and "Even if he used the f word. Whatev."

Track listing

Charts

References 

2009 singles
Eminem songs
Songs written by Eminem
Song recordings produced by Eminem
Shady Records singles
Aftermath Entertainment singles
Interscope Records singles
Songs written by Luis Resto (musician)
2009 songs
Horrorcore songs